Barrow Hann is a village in North Lincolnshire, England. It is in the civil parish of Barrow upon Humber.

External links

Villages in the Borough of North Lincolnshire